Zygocarpum is a genus of flowering plants in the family Fabaceae, and was recently assigned to the informal monophyletic Dalbergia clade of the Dalbergieae. A dichotomous key of the species of Zygocarpum has been published.

References

Dalbergieae
Fabaceae genera
Taxonomy articles created by Polbot